Giana Mohamed Farouk Lotfy (born 10 December 1994) is an Egyptian karateka. She won one of the bronze medals in the women's 61 kg event at the 2020 Summer Olympics held in Tokyo, Japan. She is a two-time gold medalist in the women's kumite 61 kg event at the World Karate Championships. She is also a gold medalist in her event at the African Games, the Islamic Solidarity Games and the Mediterranean Games.

Career 

She won the gold medal in the women's 61 kg event at the 2016 World University Karate Championships held in Braga, Portugal.

In 2018, she won the silver medal in the women's kumite 61 kg event at the Mediterranean Games held in Tarragona, Spain. In that same year, she won one of the bronze medals in the women's kumite 61 kg event at the 2018 World Karate Championships held in Madrid, Spain.

She won the gold medal in her event at the 2019 African Karate Championships held in Gaborone, Botswana. She represented Egypt at the 2019 African Games held in Rabat, Morocco and she won one of the bronze medals in the women's kumite 61 kg event.

She represented Egypt at the 2020 Summer Olympics in karate.

She won one of the bronze medals in the women's 61 kg event at the 2020 Summer Olympics held in Tokyo, Japan.

Achievements

References

External links 

 
 

1994 births
Living people
Place of birth missing (living people)
Egyptian female karateka
African Games medalists in karate
African Games gold medalists for Egypt
African Games bronze medalists for Egypt
Competitors at the 2015 African Games
Competitors at the 2019 African Games
Competitors at the 2013 Mediterranean Games
Competitors at the 2018 Mediterranean Games
Mediterranean Games medalists in karate
Mediterranean Games gold medalists for Egypt
Mediterranean Games silver medalists for Egypt
Islamic Solidarity Games medalists in karate
Karateka at the 2020 Summer Olympics
Olympic karateka of Egypt
Medalists at the 2020 Summer Olympics
Olympic medalists in karate
Olympic bronze medalists for Egypt
21st-century Egyptian women